The Easterns women's cricket team is the women's representative cricket team for the South African region of East Rand. They compete in the Women's Provincial Programme and the CSA Women's Provincial T20 Competition.

History
Easterns Women first appeared in the 1997–98 season of the Caltrate Inter-Provincial Tournament, although the full results for the tournament are unrecorded. They have competed in every season of the tournament since, with their best finish coming in the 2017–18, when they qualified for the knockout rounds and finished 7th overall. In 2019–20, they finished top of their group in the competition, setting up a promotion play-off match against Border, but the match was cancelled due to the COVID-19 pandemic and Border were promoted by virtue of their better group stage record.

They have also competed in the CSA Women's Provincial T20 Competition since its inception in 2012–13. They gained promotion in the 2019–20 season after topping their group with three wins from their four matches.

Players

Current squad
Based on squad announced for the 2021–22 season. Players in bold have international caps.

Notable players
Players who have played for Easterns and played internationally are listed below, in order of first international appearance (given in brackets):

  Cindy Eksteen (1997)
  Alta Kotze (1997)
  Kirsten Blair (2007)
  Odine Kirsten (2016)
  Tumi Sekhukhune (2018)

Honours
 CSA Women's Provincial Programme:
 Winners (0): 
 Best finish: 7th (2017–18)
 CSA Women's Provincial T20 Competition:
 Winners (0):
 Best finish: 1st in Group (2019–20)

See also
 Easterns (cricket team)

References

Women's cricket teams in South Africa
Cricket in Gauteng